Head Peak is a peak  east of Le Couteur Peak, situated on a projecting ridge of Millen Range in the névé area of Pearl Harbor Glacier, Victoria Land, Antarctica. This topographical feature was so named by the Southern Party of the New Zealand Federated Mountain Clubs Antarctic Expedition (NZFMCAE), 1962–63, due to its likeness to a head and to its position at the head of the adjacent Pearl Harbor Glacier. The peak lies situated on the Pennell Coast, a portion of Antarctica lying between Cape Williams and Cape Adare.

References

Mountains of Victoria Land
Pennell Coast